Luigia Bonfanti (born 1906, date of death unknown) was an Italian sprinter and long jumper. She was born in Milan.

Biography
Bonfanti participated at one edition of the Summer Olympics (1928), she has 2 caps in national team from 1927 to 1928.

Achievements

National titles
Bonfanti won the individual national championship four times.
1 win in  75 metres (1926)
1 win in  80 metres (1925)
1 win in  100 metres (1927)
1 win in  Long jump (1926)

See also
 Italian record progression women's long jump
 Italy national relay team

References

External links

1906 births
Year of death missing
Athletes from Milan
Italian female sprinters
Italian female long jumpers
Athletes (track and field) at the 1928 Summer Olympics
Olympic athletes of Italy
Olympic female sprinters
20th-century Italian women